Events from the year 1944 in the United Kingdom. The year was dominated by the Second World War.

Incumbents
 Monarch – George VI
 Prime Minister – Winston Churchill (Coalition)
 Parliament – 37th

Events

 January – Royal Air Force Mountain Rescue Service officially formed
 21–22 January – World War II: start of Operation Steinbock (the "Baby Blitz"), a nocturnal Luftwaffe bombing offensive chiefly targeted at the Greater London area (continues until May). On this attack, few aircraft reach the target area.
 10 February – PAYE (pay as you earn) system of tax collection introduced.
 20 February – World War II: destroyer HMS Warwick (1917) is torpedoed by German submarine U-413 off Trevose Head, Cornwall, sinking in 6 minutes with the loss of 66 men, over half her crew.
 26 February – World War II: last heavy air-raids on London.
 10 March – lifting of prohibition on married women working as teachers.
 28 April – World War II: Allied convoy T4, forming part of amphibious Exercise Tiger (a full-scale rehearsal for the Normandy landings) in Start Bay off the Devon coast, is attacked by E-boats, resulting in the deaths of 749 American servicemen from LSTs.
 3–8 May – World War II: Exercise Fabius, the last major Allied rehearsals for the Normandy landings, take place along the south coast of England.
 29 May – thunderstorms lead to severe flooding, particularly around Holmfirth.
 5 June – World War II: final preparations for the Normandy landings take place in the south of England. Group Captain James Stagg correctly forecasts a brief improvement in weather conditions over the English Channel which will permit the following day's landings to take place (having been deferred from today due to unfavourable weather). The BBC transmits coded messages (including the second line of a poem by Paul Verlaine) to underground resistance fighters in France warning that the invasion of Europe is about to begin.
 6 June – World War II: D-Day for the Normandy landings: 155,000 Allied troops land on the beaches of Normandy in France, beginning Operation Overlord and the Invasion of Normandy.

 13 June – World War II: the first V-1 flying bomb attack on London takes place. Eight civilians are killed in the blast. The bomb earns the nickname "doodlebug".
 15 July – World War II: Park Street riot in Bristol, a confrontation between black G.I.s and U.S. Military Police.
 Summer
 Ministry of Works builds the first demonstration temporary prefab houses designed for postwar reconstruction (in Northolt and on Millbank in London).
 The 1944 Summer Olympics, scheduled for London, are not held due to World War II.
 3 August – the Education Act, promoted by Rab Butler, creates a Tripartite System of secondary education in England and Wales with Secondary Modern, Technical, and Grammar schools, entrance being determined in most cases by the results of the Eleven plus exam.
 12 August – World War II: the V-1 flying bomb campaign against London by the Germans reaches its 60th day, with more than 6,000 deaths, 17,000 injuries and damage or destruction to around 1 million buildings.
 20 August – American Liberty ship  is wrecked off the Nore in the Thames Estuary with around 1,400 tonnes of explosives on board, never recovered.
 21 August – Dumbarton Oaks Conference opens in Washington, D.C.: American, British, Chinese, French and Soviet representatives meet to plan the foundation of the United Nations.
 23 August – Freckleton air disaster: A USAAF Consolidated B-24 Liberator heavy bomber crashes into the village school at Freckleton, Lancashire, in a storm with 58 ground fatalities and 3 aircrew killed. 
 7 September – the Belgian government leaves the UK and returns to Belgium following the liberation of Brussels on 3 September (by the Guards Armoured Division).
 8 September – World War II: the first V-2 rocket attack on London takes place, striking in the Chiswick district of the city and resulting in the deaths of three people.
 17 September – World War II: restrictions imposed by the Blackout are relaxed.
 25 September – World War II: V-2 rockets aimed at Ipswich and Norwich by the Germans miss their targets by a distance.
 9 October – fourth Moscow Conference: Prime Minister Winston Churchill and Soviet Premier Joseph Stalin begin a nine-day conference in Moscow to discuss the future of Europe.
 10 October – Housing (Temporary Accommodation) Act makes arrangements for postwar provision of adequate housing for all who need it.
 23 October – the Allies recognise Charles de Gaulle's cabinet as the provisional government of France.

 12 November – World War II: sinking of the German battleship Tirpitz by RAF Lancaster bombers.
 22 November – release of Laurence Olivier's Henry V, the first work of Shakespeare filmed in colour.
 25 November – World War II: a V-2 rocket destroys the Woolworths store in New Cross Road, south east London, killing 168, the highest death toll from one of these weapons. More than 100 people survive with injuries.
 27 November – RAF Fauld explosion: between 3,450 and 3,930 tons (3,500 and 4,000 tonnes) of ordnance explodes at an underground storage depot in Staffordshire leaving about 75 dead and a crater 1,200 metres (0.75 miles) across and 120 metres (400 ft) deep, one of the largest explosions in history and the largest on UK soil.
 3 December – World War II: the Home Guard is stood down.
 19 December – Council of Industrial Design established.
 24 December – World War II: fifty German V-1 flying bombs, air-launched from Heinkel He 111 bombers flying over the North Sea, target Manchester, killing at least 27 and injuring more than 100 in the Oldham area.

Publications
 H. E. Bates' novel Fair Stood the Wind for France.
 Joyce Carey's novel The Horse's Mouth.
 Agatha Christie's novels Towards Zero and Death Comes as the End.
 L. P. Hartley's novel The Shrimp and the Anemone, first in the Eustace and Hilda trilogy.
 F. W. Hayek's economic text The Road to Serfdom.
 C. S. Lewis's theological dream vision The Great Divorce (serial publication begins).
 W. Somerset Maugham's novel The Razor's Edge.
 L. T. C. Rolt's book Narrow Boat.
 G. M. Trevelyan's book English Social History: a survey of six centuries from Chaucer to Queen Victoria.

Births

January – June
 4 January – Angela Harris, Baroness Harris of Richmond, politician
 9 January – Jimmy Page, guitarist (Led Zeppelin)
 27 January
 Mairead Corrigan, Northern Irish activist, recipient of the Nobel Peace Prize
 Nick Mason, English drummer (Pink Floyd)
 28 January – John Tavener, English composer of religious music (died 2013)
 3 February – Dave Davies, rock musician (The Kinks)
 8 February – Tony Minson, virologist and academic
 10 February – Clifford T. Ward, English singer-songwriter (died 2001)
 13 February – Jerry Springer, English-born television host
 14 February – Alan Parker, English film director (died 2020)
 17 February – Karl Jenkins, Welsh composer
 24 February – Nicky Hopkins, English rock keyboardist (died 1994 in the United States)
 27 February – Roger Scruton, English philosopher (died 2020)
 1 March – Roger Daltrey, English rock singer (The Who)
 7 March – Ranulph Fiennes, English adventurer
 11 March – Don Maclean, comedian
 21 March – Mike Jackson, British Army officer
 31 March – Malcolm Roberts, singer (died 2003)
 3 April – Derek Higgs, English banker and businessman (died 2008)
 4 April –  Phyllida Barlow, sculptor (died 2023)
 6 April – Felicity Palmer, English soprano
 12 April – Lisa Jardine, née Bronowski, Renaissance historian and polymath (died 2015)
 13 April – Brian Pendleton, guitarist (died 2001)
 16 April – Sue Clifford, environmentalist and academic, co-founder of Common Ground
 23 April – Timothy Garden, Baron Garden, RAF pilot and politician (died 2007)
 25 April – Len Goodman, ballroom dancer and television personality
 26 April – Richard Bradshaw, orchestral conductor (died 2007)
 27 April – Michael Fish, television weatherman
 5 May
 Roger Rees, Welsh actor (died 2015)
 John Rhys-Davies, Welsh actor
 8 May 
 Gary Glitter, English singer and convicted sex offender
 David Vaughan, psychedelic artist (died 2003)
 12 May – Sara Kestelman, actress
 20 May – Joe Cocker, English singer (died 2014)
 25 May – Frank Oz, English puppeteer and film director
 28 May – Patricia Quinn, Northern Irish actress
 24 June
 Jeff Beck, rock guitarist (died 2023)
 John "Charlie" Whitney, rock guitarist (Family)
 1 June
 Colin Blakemore, neurobiologist (died 2022)
 Robert Powell, actor
 3 June – Peter Bonfield, businessman
 6 June – Reuven Bulka, rabbi, writer, broadcaster and activist (died 2021)
 11 June – Alan Howarth, Baron Howarth of Newport, English politician, Minister for Culture, Communications and Creative Industries

July – December
 11 July – Peter de Savary, entrepreneur (died 2022)
 12 July – Terry Cooper, English footballer (died 2021)
 21 July – Tony Scott, English film director
 27 July – Tony Capstick, English comedian, actor and musician (died 2003)
 27 July – Matthew Robinson, English television and film producer, director and writer
 31 July – Tommy Robson, English footballer (Northampton Town, Chelsea, Newcastle United, Peterborough United) (died 2020)
 2 August – Jim Capaldi, drummer and singer-songwriter (Traffic) (died 2005)
 11 August – Ian McDiarmid, Scottish actor
 15 August – R. A. W. Rhodes, political scientist and academic
 17 August – Bobby Murdoch, footballer and football manager (died 2001)
 20 August – Brian Barnes, artist (died 2021)
 26 August – Prince Richard, Duke of Gloucester, member of the British royal family
 28 August 
 Ray Lowry, cartoonist (died 2008)
 Kay Parker, actress (died 2022)
 31 August – Roger Dean, English graphic artist
 4 September 
 Tony Atkinson, economist (died 2017)
 Dave Bassett, football manager
 8 September – Margaret Hodge, politician
 13 September – Jacqueline Bisset, English film actress
 15 September – Graham Taylor, English footballer and manager (died 2017)
 18 September – Veronica Carlson, English film actress (died 2022)
 20 September 
Jeremy Child, English actor 
Paul Madeley, English footballer (died 2018)
 22 September – Frazer Hines, screen actor
 26 September – Anne Robinson, television host
 27 September – Ian Garnett, admiral
 30 September – Jimmy Johnstone, Scottish footballer
 9 October – John Entwistle, English rock bassist (The Who) (died 2002)
 15 October – David Trimble, Northern Irish politician, recipient of the Nobel Peace Prize (died 2022)
 28 October – Ian Marter, television actor and writer (died 1986)
 10 November – Tim Rice, lyricist, writer and broadcaster
 25 November – Sylvia Gore, footballer (died 2016)
 6 December – Jonathan King, music producer and convicted sex offender
 9 December
 Neil Innes, English comedian and musician (died 2019)
 Roger Short, diplomat (murdered in the 2003 Istanbul bombings)
 14 December – Denis Thwaites, English footballer (murdered in the 2015 Sousse attacks)
 19 December – Fred Callaghan, English footballer (died 2022)
 20 December – Anton Rippon, journalist and author
 21 December – Bill Atkinson, English footballer (died 2013)
 24 December – Mick Shoebottom, rugby league player (died 2002)
 27 December – Mick Jones, English rock guitarist, singer-songwriter and producer (Foreigner)

Deaths
 1 January – Sir Edwin Lutyens, architect (born 1869)
 19 January – Emily Winifred Dickson, gynaecologist (born 1866 in Ireland)
 9 February – Agnes Mary Frances Duclaux, poet, biographer and novelist (born 1857)
 12 February
 Olive Custance, Lady Alfred Douglas, poet (born 1874)
 Kenneth Gandar-Dower, sportsman, aviator, explorer and author, torpedoed (born 1908)
 2 March – Ida Maclean, biochemist, first woman admitted to the Chemical Society of London (born 1877)
 5 March – Alun Lewis, war poet (born 1915)
 24 March – Orde Wingate, soldier, in aviation accident in India (born 1903)
 19 March – Mary Paley Marshall, economist (born 1850)
 2 April – John Batchelor, missionary (born 1855)
 13 April – Hugh Lowther, 5th Earl of Lonsdale, sportsman, donor of the Lonsdale Belt in boxing (born 1857)
 16 April – William Percival Crozier, editor of The Manchester Guardian (born 1879)
 17 April – J. T. Hearne, cricketer (born 1867)
 8 May – Dame Ethel Smyth, composer and suffragette (born 1858)
 12 May
 Sir Arthur Quiller-Couch ('Q'), writer (born 1863)
 9 June – Keith Douglas, war poet, killed in action (born 1920)
 6 July
 Vera Leigh, SOE agent, executed in France (born 1903)
 Diana Rowden, SOE agent, executed in France (born 1915)
 18 July 
 Thomas Sturge Moore, poet, author and artist (born 1870)
 Rex Whistler, painter, killed in action (born 1905)
 28 July – Ralph H. Fowler, astronomer and physicist (born 1889)
 13 August – Ethel Lina White, crime novelist (born 1876)
 19 August – Sir Henry Wood, orchestral conductor (born 1869)
 13 September
 Noor Inayat Khan, SOE agent, executed in Germany (born 1914 in Russia)
 Eliane Plewman, SOE agent, executed in Germany (born 1917 in France) 
 W. Heath Robinson, cartoonist and illustrator (born 1872)
 25 September – Sir Leo Chiozza Money, economist and politician (born 1870 in Italy)
 27 September – David Dougal Williams, painter (born 1888)
 23 October – Charles Glover Barkla, physicist, Nobel Prize laureate (born 1877)
 26 October
 The Princess Beatrice, last surviving child of Queen Victoria (born 1857)
 William Temple, Archbishop of Canterbury (born 1881)
 31 October – Joseph Hubert Priestley, botanist (born 1883)
 4 November – Sir John Dill, Field Marshal (born 1881)
 7 November – Geoffrey Dawson, newspaper editor (born 1874)
 14 November – Sir Trafford Leigh-Mallory, Air Chief Marshal, in aviation accident in France (born 1892)
 22 November
 Sir George Clausen, painter (born 1852)
 Sir Arthur Eddington, astrophysicist (born 1882)
 30 November – Roy Emerton, actor (born 1893)
 26 December – George Bellamy, silent film actor (born 1866)

See also
 List of British films of 1944
 Military history of the United Kingdom during World War II

References

 
Years of the 20th century in the United Kingdom